Vallabhi (or Valabhi or Valabhipur, modern Vala; Devanāgarī: वल्लभी) is an ancient city located in the Saurashtra peninsula of Gujarat, near Bhavnagar in western India. It is also known as Vallabhipura and was the capital of the Suryavanshi Maitraka Dynasty.

History

Vallabhi was occupied as early as the Harappan period, and was later part of the Maurya Empire from about 322 BCE until 185 BCE.

The Satavahana dynasty ruled the area, off and on, from the late second century BCE until the early third century CE.  The Gupta Empire held the area from approximately 319 CE to 467 CE. 

The Great Council of Vallabhi, which codified the Śvētāmbaras Jain texts, was held there in 454 CE, during the decline of the Gupta Empire.

In the fifth century (CE), the first two Maitraka rulers, Bhatarka and Dharasena I, only used the title of Senapati (general). The third ruler, Dronasimha (Dronasena ), declared himself Maharaja (literally "Great King"). King Guhasena came after him. Unlike his predecessors, the king stopped using the term Paramabhattaraka Padanudhyata alongside his name, a term that denotes nominal allegiance to the Gupta overlords. He was succeeded by his son Dharasena II, who used the title Mahadhiraja. The next ruler was his son, Siladitya-I Dharmaditya, who was described by a Chinese scholar and traveller Xuanzang as a "monarch of great administrative ability and of rare kindness and compassion". Siladitya I was succeeded by his younger brother Kharagraha I.

During the time of Kharagraha I, a copperplate grant was found from 616 CE that shows that his territories included Ujjain. During the reign of the next ruler, his son Dharasena III, north Gujarat was assimilated into the kingdom. Dharasena II was succeeded by another son of Kharagraha I, Dhruvasena II, Baladitya. He married the daughter of Harshavardhana and their son Dharasena IV assumed the imperial titles of Paramabhattaraka Mahrajadhiraja Parameshvara Chakravartin and Sanskrit poet Bhatti was his court poet. The next powerful ruler of this dynasty was Siladitya III. After him, Siladitya V ruled, and it is suspected that during his reign, there was an Arab Invasion. The last known ruler of the dynasty was Siladitya VII.

The rule of the Maitrakas is believed to have ended during the second or third quarter of the eighth century when the Arabs invaded.

Valabhi inscriptions

Religious inscriptions are known from Valhabi, which were dedicated to the Brahmans as well as the Buddhist and Jains. The Indologist Sylvain Lévi wrote an article entitled "Les donations religieuses des rois de Valhabi".

The numerals used in the Valhabi inscriptions and on their coins, dated to circa 600CE, are often mentioned as an intermediary step in the evolution of Hindu-Arabic numerals.

See also

 Vala State
 Valabhi University

References

Cities and towns in Bhavnagar district